The  Renault 6Q, also called the Renault Bengali 6, is an air-cooled inverted in-line six-cylinder, aircraft piston engine, producing about  continuous power. It was designed and built in France and produced for more than ten years after its homologation in 1936, with large numbers built during World War II.

Design and development

The six-cylinder Renault 6Q  and the four-cylinder Renault 4P, both from the early 1930s, shared the same bore, stroke and pistons.

The 6Q was built in both unsupercharged and supercharged forms. The centrifugal supercharger was added at the back of the engine, driven off the crankshaft via step-up gearing.

Operational history
The 6Q was homologated in 1936; 1700 were built before the war and 1660 during it. Post-war, production was resumed. The majority of pre-war 6Qs were used in Caudron C.440 Goélands, during the war in Goélands and post-war in Nord's Messerschmitt Bf 108 derived Nord Pingouin,  in the Nord Noralpha and Ramier Bf 108 developments.

Variants

Even sub-type numbers rotate clockwise, odd numbers anti-clockwise as seen from engine.

Renault 6Q-00/01 Unsupercharged LH/RH rotation
Renault 6Q-02/03  Supercharged to  LH/RH rotation
Renault 6Q-04/05  Supercharged to  LH/RH rotation
Renault 6Q-06/07  LH/RH rotation
Renault 6Q-08/09  LH/RH rotation
Renault 6Q-10/11  LH/RH rotation
Renault 6Q-18/19 LH/RH rotation
Renault 6Q-20/21  LH/RH rotation

Applications
 Caudron C.440 Goéland
 Caudron C.631-5 Simoun
 Caudron C.640 Typhon
 Caudron C.690
 Caudron C.860
 Dewoitine HD.730
 Farman F.430
 Hanriot H.230
 Morane-Saulnier MS.350
 Morane-Saulnier MS.501
 Nord 1101/2 Noralpha/Ramier
 Nord Pingouin
 Potez 661
 Rey R.1
 SNCASE SE-700
 SNCASE SE-1210

Engines on display
Ailes Anciennes, Toulouse: Renault 6Q 10 in a Nord 1101 Ramier I.

Specifications (post-war unsupercharged)

See also

References

Air-cooled aircraft piston engines
Inverted aircraft piston engines
1930s aircraft piston engines
6
Straight-six engines